Martin Pelletier (born April 1, 1967) is a former Canadian para table tennis player who has competed in five Parapan American Games. He was a teammate of Ian Kent who has also won multiple medals.

In July 1992, Pelletier was involved in a serious motorcycle accident which resulted in a right arm amputation, he started playing table tennis recreationally with friends two years after the accident. He became the first Canadian table tennis player to win a table tennis title in 2001 in Buenos Aires, he went on to compete in the 2000 Summer Paralympics but didn't advance to final rounds.

References

External links
 
 

1967 births
Sportspeople from Gatineau
Paralympic table tennis players of Canada
Table tennis players at the 2000 Summer Paralympics
Living people
Canadian amputees
Medalists at the 2007 Parapan American Games
Canadian male table tennis players